Finn Christensen may refer to:
 Finn Christensen (footballer)
 Finn Christensen (artist)
 Finn Thunbo Christensen, Danish sailor